Ziyaran Rural District is a rural district (dehestan) in the Central District of Abyek County, Qazvin Province, Iran. At the 2006 census, its population was 12,024, in 3,303 families.  The rural district has 17 villages. Tati is the main language of Ziyaran Rural District.

References 

Rural Districts of Qazvin Province
Abyek County